Andrzej "Kozak" Kozakiewicz (born 6 July 1966 in Piła) is a Master of politology and co-founder of Pidżama Porno, Strachy na Lachy and Świat Czarownic, where he plays on the guitar. He is married and has a son named Mikołaj.

References 
Bio

1966 births
Living people
Polish musicians